Firuz Kola-ye Olya (also Romanized as Fīrūz Kolā-ye ‘Olyā; also known as Fīrūz Kalā and Fīrūz Kolā-ye Bālā) is a village in Tavabe-e Kojur Rural District, Kojur District, Nowshahr County, Mazandaran Province, Iran. At the 2006 census, its population was 174, in 41 families.

References 

Populated places in Nowshahr County